is a football (soccer) club based in Iwaki, a city in Fukushima Prefecture, Japan. The club will play in J2 League, Japan's 2nd tier of professional league football.

History

Founder Club 
Iwaki FC was founded in 2012, before getting official recognition in 2013 with the creation of their homonymous corporation. The club name got more attention when Under Armour decided to join the club and support it to climb the Japanese football pyramid from the bottom. There had been a big vision behind the club, with the will of "making Iwaki the central football-city in Tohoku". In fact, a new training field opened in November 2016 and the club-house was just launched in May 2017: two central structures to rise to the top of Japanese football.

Fukushima Prefectural Football League (2013–2017) 
Plus, results are pushing Iwaki FC, which has won several categories in Fukushima Prefectural Football League, coming to first division: the next target is Tohoku Soccer League, while the club has even achieved their first win at National Club Team Football Championship Tournament (winning the final 9–0). Iwaki FC also debuted at Emperor's Cup in 2017 edition. After defeating Norbritz Hokkaido in the first round, they surprisingly overcame Hokkaido Consadole Sapporo for 5–2 after extra-time. They lost against Shimizu S-Pulse in the third round, but it was still a surprising run.

Tohoku Soccer League (2018–2019) 
In the 2019 season, Iwaki FC earned promotion to the following year's JFL for the first time in history after two seasons in Tohoku Soccer League competition, with the club winning the All Japan Regional Promotion Series and as a result Iwaki was crowned champions.

Japan Football League (JFL) (2020–2021) 
In the 2021 season, Iwaki FC earned promotion to the following year's J3 League for the first time in history after two seasons in JFL competition, after finishing in first position, the team were crowned champions for their first title of fourth tier in Japan Football League.

J. League (2022–) 
In the 2022 season, Iwaki FC earned promotion to the following year's J2 League for the first time in history after a single season in J3 League, after get a J2 license on 28 October 2022. On 6 November at same year, they were crowned J3 League champions for the first time in their history. They secured the league title on the 32nd round, following their 3–0 win against Kagoshima United and defeats from the 2nd and 3rd-placed teams at the round, being them Fujieda MYFC and Matsumoto Yamaga, respectively. 14 days later, Iwaki FC finished as league champions, ending their 2022 season with 78 points from 34 matches, staying 11 points clear off 2nd-placed Fujieda MYFC, who also ended up being promoted for the J2.

Stadium 
Iwaki FC used to J-Village Stadium for 2022 season in J3. But, since promotion to J2 League, Iwaki will use Iwaki Green Field for 2023 season.

League and cup record 

Key
 Pos. = Position in league; P = Games played; W = Games won; D = Games drawn; L = Games lost; F = Goals scored; A = Goals conceded; GD = Goals difference; Pts = Points gained

Honours 
J3 League
Champions (1st): 2022
Japan Football League
Champions (1st): 2021
National Club Team Football Championship Tournament
Champions (1st): 2016
All Japan Regional Football Champions League
Champions (1st): 2019
Shakaijin Cup
Bronze medal (3rd): 2018, 2019

Current squad 
As of 13 February 2023.

Out on loan

Club officials
For the 2023 season.

First-team

Academy

Managerial history

Kit evolution

References

External links 
Official Site (Japanese)

Iwaki FC
Football clubs in Japan
Sports teams in Fukushima Prefecture
Iwaki, Fukushima
Association football clubs established in 2012
2012 establishments in Japan
Japan Football League clubs
J.League clubs